Busang Rasefako (born 17 March 1972) is a Botswana former footballer who played as a midfielder. He played for the Botswana national football team between 2000 and 2003.

External links
 

Association football midfielders
Botswana footballers
Botswana international footballers
1972 births
Living people